The Military ranks of Moldova are the military insignia used by the Armed Forces of the Republic of Moldova. Moldova is a landlocked country, and does therefore not possess a navy.

Commissioned officer ranks
The rank insignia of commissioned officers.

Other ranks
The rank insignia of non-commissioned officers and enlisted personnel.

References

External links
 
 

Moldova
Military of Moldova